La Güera ( al-Gūwayra; also known as La Agüera, Lagouira, El Gouera) is a ghost town on the Atlantic coast at the southern tip of Western Sahara, on the western side of the Ras Nouadhibou peninsula which is split in two by the Mauritania–Western Sahara border,  west of Nouadhibou. It is also the name of a daira at the Sahrawi refugee camps in south-western Algeria.

It is the southernmost town of Western Sahara. La Güera is situated south of the Moroccan Wall, and is technically abandoned.

History
The name La Güera comes from the Spanish word  which is a ditch that carries rainwater to crops.

Foundation and settlement

La Güera came into existence in late 1920, when Spanish colonizer Francisco Bens (who had earlier taken possession of the Cape Juby region as a protectorate in 1916), after negotiating with tribal chiefs of the zone, established a fort and an air base on the western side of the Ras Nouadhibou peninsula, just a few kilometres away from the French settlement of Port-Étienne (now Nouadhibou) on the eastern side of the peninsula. (In the 1912 Convention of Madrid, Spain and France had agreed on a border between Mauritania and Spanish possessions that ran down the middle of the peninsula.)

In 1924, La Güera was incorporated into the Spanish colony of Río de Oro. During the short period (1920–1924) that the town was ruled as a separate part of the colony it released its own postage stamps. The town was served by La Güera Airport until the 1970s.

Western Sahara War

In 1979, when Mauritania withdrew from the war, La Güera's population was estimated to be 816 inhabitants.

By 2002, it had been abandoned and partially overblown by sand, inhabited only by a few Imraguen fishermen and guarded by a Mauritanian military outpost, despite this not being Mauritanian territory.

Twin towns and sister cities

  Águilas, Murcia, Spain (since July 18, 2005)
  Alaquàs, Valencia, Valencian Community, Spain (since April 14, 2004)
  Almansa, Albacete, Castilla-La Mancha, Spain 
  Castagneto Carducci, Livorno, Tuscany, Italy
  Crevillent,  Alicante, Valencian Community, Spain
  El Puerto de Santa María, Cádiz, Andalucía, Spain (since 1993)
  Fauglia, Pisa, Tuscany, Italy (since 2009)
  Gorliz, Biscay, Basque Country, Spain
  Guadix, Granada, Andalucía, Spain
  Iurreta, Biscay, Basque Country, Spain
  Leganés, Madrid, Spain (since August 17, 2001)
  Londa, Florence, Tuscany, Italy (since 2017)
  Monteriggioni, Siena, Tuscany, Italy
  Orio, Gipuzkoa, Basque Country, Spain
  San Marcello Piteglio, Pistoia, Tuscany, Italy
  Santa Lucía de Tirajana, Las Palmas, Canary Islands, Spain (since October 29, 1986 -First twinning between a Sahrawi and a Spanish town-)
  Valle de Yerri, Navarra, Spain (since September 29, 2005)
  Vitoria, Álava, Basque Country, Spain (since 1987)

References

External links
 Map of Ras Nouadhibou peninsula
 El Último Testigo La Agüera Memories of the son of a Spanish lieutenant in La Güera during the 1930s 

Ghost towns in Africa
Former populated places in Western Sahara
Military locations of Mauritania
Border crossings in divided regions
Populated places established in 1920
1920 establishments in Africa